Matthew Langridge  (born 20 May 1983) is a British rower. At the 2012 Summer Olympics in London he was part of the British crew that won the bronze medal in the men's eight. He was the 2015 European Champion in the men's pair, along with James Foad. At the 2016 Summer Olympics in Rio de Janeiro he was part of the British crew that won the gold medal in the men's eight.

Biography

Junior
Matthew was born in Crewe, Cheshire, and grew up in the town of Northwich, attending Hartford High School and gaining his A Levels at St Nicholas Catholic High School. He started rowing at Northwich Rowing Club being coached by Paul Rafferty.

At his first World Rowing Junior Championships in Zagreb, Croatia in 2000 he narrowly missed out on a medal coming fourth in the double scull with Pete Wells of Queen Elizabeth High School, Hexham. A few weeks earlier they had lost out in the final of the Double Sculls Challenge Cup at Henley Royal Regatta, to the Danish double of Kalizan and Samuelsen.

In 2001 he was the first ever junior British oarsman to win the gold medal in the single sculls event in the World Rowing Junior Championships in Duisburg, Germany in 2001. Later that year, he broke the British Indoor Rowing record for 2,000m in the J18 category, posting a time of 5 minutes and 59 seconds.

Senior
Matthew raced at the 2004 Summer Olympics in Athens in the Men's Double Sculls with Matthew Wells, and missed out by 0.06 seconds on a place in Final A.  They won Final B, ranking them 8th overall, as the A final included 7 crews (rather than the typical 6) due to a tie for 3rd between Norway and USA in semi-final A.

In the 2007 season he won two World Cup Gold Medals, in a pair with Colin Smith at Linz, and in an eight at Amsterdam, before winning the bronze medal in the pair at the World Championships in Munich.  He won the bronze medal at the 2007 British Indoor Rowing Championships in the Men's Heavyweight category.

In the 2008 Summer Olympics he was selected to compete in the Men's Eight in Beijing.  In the run-up to the games, he won silver at the Munich World Cup event, bronze in Lucerne, and gold in Poznań.  At the Beijing Olympics he rowed in the 7 seat of the men's eight, qualifying for the final in the fastest time of either heat, 1.8 seconds ahead of the pre-games favourites, Canada.  In the final, despite a late charge from Great Britain, the eight was narrowly beaten by Canada, with Langridge winning a silver medal. He was part of the British squad that topped the medal table at the 2011 World Rowing Championships in Bled, where he won a gold medal as part of the coxless four with Richard Egington, Tom James and Alex Gregory.

At the 2012 Summer Olympics in London he was part of the British crew that won the bronze medal in the men's eight. He competed at the 2014 World Rowing Championships in Bosbaan, Amsterdam, where he won a silver medal as part of the coxless pair with James Foad and was part of the British team that topped the medal table at the 2015 World Rowing Championships at Lac d'Aiguebelette in France, where he won a silver medal as part of the coxless pair with James Foad.
 
At the 2016 Summer Olympics in Rio de Janeiro he was part of the British crew that won the gold medal in the men's eight. Soon afterwards, he retired from professional rowing and spent a year working as a rowing coach for The Grange School, Hartford.

After Rowing

In October 2020, Matt qualified as a Commercial Pilot.

Honours
Langridge was awarded the MBE in the Queen's 2017 New Year Honours list for services to rowing.

Achievements

Olympics
2016 Rio de Janeiro – GOLD, Eight, (7)
2012 London – BRONZE, Eight, (2)
2008 Beijing – SILVER, Eight (7)
2004 Athens – 8th, Double (stroke)

World Championships
2015 Lac d'Aiguebelette – Silver, Coxless Pair (stroke)
2014 Amsterdam – Silver, Coxless Pair (stroke)
2011 Bled – Gold, Men's Four
2010 Lake Karapiro – 4th, Men's Four
2009 Poznań – Gold, Men's Four
2007 Munich – Bronze, Coxless Pair (stroke)

World Cups
2008 Poznań – Gold, Eight (7)
2008 Lucerne – Bronze, Eight (3)
2008 Munich – Silver, Eight (3)
2007 Amsterdam – Gold, Eight (7)
2007 Linz – Gold, Coxless Pair (stroke)

Junior World Championships
2001 Duisburg – Gold, Single Scull

References

External links
 
 – Concept 2 British Indoor Rowing Records

1983 births
Living people
Sportspeople from Crewe
Sportspeople from Northwich
English male rowers
Olympic rowers of Great Britain
Rowers at the 2004 Summer Olympics
Rowers at the 2008 Summer Olympics
Rowers at the 2012 Summer Olympics
Rowers at the 2016 Summer Olympics
Olympic silver medallists for Great Britain
Olympic medalists in rowing
Olympic bronze medallists for Great Britain
Medalists at the 2012 Summer Olympics
Medalists at the 2008 Summer Olympics
Members of Leander Club
British male rowers
World Rowing Championships medalists for Great Britain
Olympic gold medallists for Great Britain
Medalists at the 2016 Summer Olympics
Members of the Order of the British Empire
European Rowing Championships medalists